Move to Amend is a national, non-partisan, grassroots organization that seeks to blunt corporate power by amending the United States Constitution to end corporate personhood and state that money is not speech. The group was created in response to the 2010 Supreme Court ruling Citizens United v. Federal Election Commission, which held that corporations have a First Amendment right to make expenditures from their general treasuries supporting or opposing candidates for political office, arguing that the Court's decision disrupts the democratic process by granting disproportionate influence to the wealthy.

Background 
In 2009, several national organizations including the Women's International League for Peace and Freedom, the Program on Corporations, and Democracy (POCLAD) and Democracy Unlimited of Humboldt County (DUHC) submitted an amicus curiae authored by former Massachusetts assistant attorney general Jeff Clements to the Supreme Court in Citizens United v. Federal Election Commission, a U.S. constitutional law case concerning the regulation of independent political expenditures by corporations, which the non-profit organization Citizens United challenged on the grounds of violating the First Amendment’s freedom of speech. The brief argued against Citizens United and called for the court to reverse its precedents on corporate personhood, citing the 1886 case of Santa Clara County v. Southern Pacific Railroad Co. that preceded the extension of constitutional protections to corporations under the Fourteenth Amendment.

When the Court ruled to allow for corporations to make political expenditures from their general treasuries under the First Amendment's free speech rights in January 2010, several organizers and attorneys from those organizations behind the brief launched Move to Amend as a national campaign to overturn the Citizens United ruling, arguing that the Court’s decision disrupts the democratic process by granting disproportionate influence to the wealthy with the intent of promoting corporate power at the expense of ordinary citizens.

Resolutions and ballot campaigns 
Move to Amend's strategy has included grassroots organizing to lobby elected officials and candidates to pass local resolutions and ordinances through municipalities, which call on state and federal representatives to support a 28th Amendment and may include holding a "Democracy Day" public hearing. As of July 2019, over 800 local governments and 20 states have passed resolutions and ordinances supporting a constitutional amendment to address the Citizens United ruling. Over 300 resolutions were passed by voters via ballot initiatives, including statewide initiatives in Colorado, Montana, California and Washington.

Local affiliates of Move to Amend have helped pass many such resolutions supporting the language of the We the People Amendment, including the Los Angeles City Council which voted unanimously to end constitutional rights for corporations in 2011. In Ohio, local ordinances supporting the amendment and creating a "Democracy Day" public hearing to examine the local impact of political influence by corporations have been passed by municipal governments and voters via ballot initiatives, including Cleveland and Toledo. In Wisconsin, over 100 municipalities have passed resolutions, comprising 55% of Wisconsin residents.

Leadership 
The group has included organizers and attorneys from several national organizations among its leadership, including: 
 Kaitlin Sopoci-Belknap, Move to Amend’s national director and director of Democracy Unlimited of Humboldt County
 David Cobb, 2004 Green Party presidential candidate and principal of POCLAD
 Riki Ott, a co-director of Ultimate Civics, is a co-founder 
 Ben Manski, an executive director of the Liberty Tree Foundation
 George Friday, national steering committee member of the Independent Progressive Politics Network
 Lisa Graves, executive director for the Center for Media and Democracy
 Nancy Price, co-chair of the Alliance for Democracy and committee chair for Women’s International League for Peace & Freedom
 Jerome Scott, a member of the League of Revolutionary Black Workers and founding director of Project South
 Laura Bonham, a co-founder of Progressive Democrats of America and co-chair of the Justice Party
 Maria Agosto, a member of the Poor People's Economic Human Rights Campaign (PPEHRC)

References

External links



Electoral reform groups in the United States
Political advocacy groups in the United States
Campaign finance reform in the United States
Corporate personhood
Anti-corporate activism